Jozef "Jos" De Schoenmaecker (born 2 October 1947, in Mechelen) is a former Belgian professional road bicycle racer.

Major results

1967
Tour de Namur
1968
Tour de Namur
1970
Omloop der Zennevalei
1971
Omloop Hageland-Zuiderkempen
Onze-Lieve-Vrouw Waver
1972
Rijmenam
1973
Vuelta a España:
Winner stages 4 and 6B
Oostduinkerke
1976
Flèche Rebecquoise
1980
Koersel
Tour de France:
Winner stage 16

External links 

Uno De Los Imprescindibles: Jozef De Schoenmaecker (One Of The Essentials: Jozef De Schoenmaecker) 
Photo of Jos De Schoenmaecker at 1972 Tour de France
Article with 2015 photo including Jozef De Schoenmaecker 

Belgian male cyclists
1947 births
Living people
Belgian Tour de France stage winners
Belgian Vuelta a España stage winners
Sportspeople from Mechelen
Cyclists from Antwerp Province